Aleksandr Nikolayevich Bakulev ( - March 31, 1967) was a Soviet surgeon, one of the founders of cardiovascular surgery in the USSR.

Born in Nevenikovskaya (now in the Kirov oblast) into a peasant family which belonged to the old Vyatka clan of Bakulevs, Bakulev attended the medical faculty of Saratov University after graduating from high school. During the First World War he served as a regimental medical officer on the Western Front. In 1938 Bakulev conducted a successful lobectomy in a case of chronic lung abscess. In 1939 he earned the academic degree of Professor and the same year conducted a successful lobectomy in a case of pulmonary actinomycosis. In 1943 Bakulev became head of the surgery department of the 2nd Pirogov Moscow Institute of Medicine. On the Eastern Front of World War II, Bakulev was the chief surgeon of Moscow evacuation hospitals. In 1948 he pioneered the surgical treatment of congenital heart disorders in the Soviet Union. He was the President of the USSR Academy of Sciences from 1953 to 1960.

In 1955 he suggested the foundation of the Thoracic Surgery Institute (now the Bakulev Scientific Center of Cardiovascular Surgery) and then became its first head. In 1958 Bakulev was elected as a member of the Soviet Academy of Sciences.

Bakulev died in Moscow in 1967. A medical prize was named after him.

Honours and awards
 Hero of Socialist Labour (Decree of the Presidium of the Supreme Soviet on 8 December 1960)
 Lenin Prize (1957)
 Stalin Prize, 2nd class (1949)
 Three Orders of Lenin (incl 1960)
 Order of the Red Banner of Labour
 Order of the Red Star
 Order "Credit for the people" (Yugoslavia)
 Order "Citizenship Award" (Bulgaria)
 Honoured Scientist of RSFSR (1946)
 Doctor honoris causa of the University of Turin.

References

Krugosvet.ru
Great Soviet Encyclopedia
Министерство обороны Российской Федерации | Бакулев Александр Николаевич

1890 births
1967 deaths
20th-century Russian physicians
People from Kirov Oblast
People from Slobodskoy Uyezd
Fourth convocation members of the Soviet of the Union
Fifth convocation members of the Soviet of the Union
Inventors from the Russian Empire
Surgeons from the Russian Empire
Soviet thoracic surgeons
Soviet Army officers
Academicians of the USSR Academy of Medical Sciences
Full Members of the USSR Academy of Sciences
Presidents of the USSR Academy of Medical Sciences
Heroes of Socialist Labour
Stalin Prize winners
Lenin Prize winners
Recipients of the Order of Lenin
Recipients of the Order of the Red Banner of Labour
Recipients of the Order of the Red Star
Russian people of World War I
Soviet people of World War II
Burials at Novodevichy Cemetery
Soviet military doctors